Delhi Capitals is an Indian professional basketball team located in Delhi, India. The team last competed in India's UBA Pro Basketball League.

Players

References

External links
Presentation at Asia-basket.com
Presentation at facebook.com

Basketball teams in India
Basketball in Delhi
Basketball teams established in 2015
2015 establishments in Delhi